Danish Football Supporter Association, also known as DFF, is the official association of fanclubs of the football (soccer) teams of Denmark. It was founded in the fall of 2003 by representatives from 20 official football fanclubs from the highest leagues of Danish football.

Organization
DFF was formerly known as Superligaens Fanklub Forening, which only served the interests of the fanclubs of teams playing in the top-flight Danish Superliga. As a need to strengthen the ties between the Superliga and the lower divisions arose, DFF was created to serve as an umbrella organization for all official football fanclubs. That is, fanclubs from the three highest leagues in Danish football, who have been officially endorsed by their respective football clubs. In addition to the fan clubs of Danish clubs, the Roligan supporters of the Danish national team in De Danske Roligans are also members of DFF.

The members of DFF elect a board on general assembly, with board members working in different committees, as well as in ad hoc working groups. Among other things, DFF works on increasing fan safety at football matches, and the prevention of violence, racism and vandalism among the fans.

Members
The members of DFF include football fan clubs of the clubs playing in the Danish Superliga, the Danish 1st and 2nd Divisions and the Denmark national football team. The reorganization of the federation meant an increasing flow of members, giving it more than 40,000 members, registered in 23 official football fan clubs.

External links
FairFans.dk - official site

Association football supporters' associations
Football in Denmark